"Alfonso Muskedunder" is a song by Norwegian DJ Todd Terje from his debut studio album It's Album Time. It was released as the sixth single from the album on 30 March 2015 with a 12" vinyl release consisting of remixes. A music video for the song was published on Terje's YouTube channel.

The song was used in the Better Call Saul episode "Sunk Costs", during a montage of attorney Kim Wexler's morning routine.

Music video
The music video for "Alfonso Muskedunder" was released on April 7, 2015 on Terje's YouTube channel at a total length of three minutes and forty-seven seconds. The video was made by Bendik Kaltenborn and Espen Friberg and is completely animated.

Track listing
 Alfonso Muskedunder Remixed

Release history

References

2014 songs
2015 singles
Todd Terje songs
Nu jazz songs